Jonathan Joseph Sauter (born May 1, 1978) is an American professional stock car racing driver. He competes part-time in the NASCAR Craftsman Truck Series, driving the No. 46 Toyota Tundra for G2G Racing. He has also driven in the NASCAR Cup Series and NASCAR Xfinity Series in the past. Sauter is the son of former NASCAR driver Jim Sauter, the brother of NASCAR drivers Tim Sauter and Jay Sauter, and the uncle of Travis Sauter. He is the 2016 NASCAR Camping World Truck Series champion.

Early career
After graduating high school in 1996, Sauter began competing in various amateur series throughout Wisconsin and the Midwest. By the end of 1997, Sauter had collected three wins in the Sportsman Division at Dells Raceway Park and a win in the Late Model Division at the La Crosse Fairgrounds Speedway. Sauter then joined the American Speed Association Series in 1998. By 2001, he was the ASA Series Champion.

NASCAR

2001–2005
In 2001, following Sauter's ASA Championship, Richard Childress Racing invited him to drive the No. 21 Rockwell Automation-sponsored Chevrolet in five Busch Series races. Sauter finished in the Top 15 in three of his five Busch starts, including a fifth-place finish in the AutoLite Fram 250 at Richmond, which was his first start in the series.  

In 2002, Childress hired Sauter to run a full Busch Series schedule in the No. 2 AC Delco-sponsored Chevrolet. He notched five Top 10 finishes, including his first Busch Series win in the Tropicana Twister 300 at the Chicagoland Speedway, despite skipping one race. Sauter was involved in one of the biggest accidents in NASCAR history in the Aaron's 312 at Talladega, where 33 of 43 cars were involved, and 15 of them were taken out of the race. In 2003, Sauter drove for Childress Racing and the Curb Agajanian Performance Group in the Busch Series, piloting the No. 21 PayDay-sponsored Chevrolet and the No. 43 Channellock/Curb Records-sponsored Chevrolet. He captured 14 Top 10 finishes in 34 Busch Series starts, including a win at Richmond in the No. 43. Sauter finished the 2003 season eighth in the driver standings and, together with Kevin Harvick, led the No. 21 car to the owners' points championship. 

During the 2003 season, Sauter also made his Winston Cup debut, driving the No. 4 Kodak Easy Share-sponsored Pontiac Grand Prix for five races with Morgan-McClure Motorsports. His best start in five races was a 23rd at Loudon, and he also missed a race at Kansas Speedway. He also ran three races in the Craftsman Truck Series for Fasscore Motorsports, and had a tenth-place run at Richmond. Childress hired Sauter to drive the No. 30 AOL-sponsored Chevrolet in Winston Cup full-time in 2004. After thirteen races, he was replaced by Dave Blaney, but later attempted two races in Childress' No. 33 car, but did not qualify for either of them. Towards the end of the season, he began running the No. 09 Miccosukee Gaming & Resorts-sponsored Dodge Intrepid for Phoenix Racing, and had a best finish of 29th. He also ran a full Busch schedule with Brewco Motorsports that season, driving the No. 27 Kleenex-sponsored Pontiac to an 18th-place points finish.

Sauter joined Phoenix full-time in 2005, with Yellow Transportation becoming the team's primary sponsor. He had 11 Top 10 finishes and a win at his home track at Milwaukee, and improved his position in points to twelfth for the year. However, Sauter was disqualified at Texas after his car failed a post-race inspection. Sauter and Phoenix also competed in ten Cup races, posting a ninth-place finish at Phoenix.

2006–present

After the 2005 season, Sauter and Yellow moved to the No. 00 Haas CNC Racing Chevrolet for the next season. He had one pole and nine top-tens, and tied his best finish of eighth in series points. He made one Cup start that season that year at the Coca-Cola 600, and finished 24th. He moved up to a new Cup team for a new team for Haas, the No. 70, in 2007. Driving with sponsorships from Yellow, Best Buy, Haas Automation, and Radioactive Energy Drink, Sauter had two Top 10s but finished 30th in points. He competed in six Busch races that year with Jay Robinson Racing, but could not finish higher than 23rd.

Sauter was dropped from the No. 70 after the season, and rejoined Phoenix Racing for the 2008 season, where he was released after five races. He has since spent time as a substitute driver for many teams, starting at Las Vegas Motor Speedway, where he was unable to qualify the No. 21 McKee Foods-sponsored Ford. He soon returned to Haas to drive several races in their No. 70, with a best finish of 20th, as well as attempting several races for John Carter. After one-off starts for Fitz Motorsports and Bob Schact in the Nationwide Series, he drove for Curb Agajanian Performance Group and Derrike Cope Racing, but did not complete a race for either team. He also drove one Truck race at Martinsville for SS-Green Light Racing. Sauter returned to the trucks in 2009, replacing Shelby Howard in the No. 13 FunSand-sponsored truck for ThorSport Racing in association with Cary Agajanian. Sauter won his first ever Truck Series race at the Las Vegas, holding off teammate Matt Crafton for the win. Sauter beat Tayler Malsam in the NASCAR Rookie of the Year standings. For 2010, Sauter attempted the No. 35 Chevy for Tommy Baldwin Racing for 3 races and took over the No. 36 ride after Phoenix with little success. He also drove some late-season races for Prism Motorsports in the No. 66 Toyota. He picked up his second career truck win in 2010 at Kansas after a late race collision and save with Ron Hornaday Jr.

Sauter grabbed his 3rd career victory at Martinsville in 2011, battling Kyle Busch on the last lap. Despite winning the season-finale at the Ford 200, he lost the championship to Austin Dillon by 6 points.

He would win the 2012 WinStar World Casino 400K with a ThorSport Racing 1–2 finish alongside Matt Crafton.

In 2013, Sauter started the season with his first win at Daytona International Speedway in the NextEra Energy Resources 250. It was also Toyota's 100th Camping World Truck Series win. On April 6, Sauter won the Kroger 250 at Martinsville Speedway. It was only the second time in Truck Series history that someone has won back-to-back season opening wins since Mark Martin did it in 2006.

While competing full-time in the Truck Series, Sauter raced several times in his home state of Wisconsin in 2015. He appeared at the Slinger Nationals at Slinger Super Speedway, won an ARCA Midwest Tour race at Madison International Speedway, the Larry Detjens Memorial Race at State Park Speedway, and set a new Super Late Model track record at an ARCA Midwest Tour race at Wisconsin International Raceway.

On October 15, 2015, Sauter announced that he would be joining GMS Racing for 2016. Sauter won in his debut with GMS at Daytona. In the Chase, Sauter won at Martinsville and Texas to advance to the championship 4. Sauter went on to win the championship at Homestead, finishing 3rd in the race. Sauter had a successful 2017 season, winning Dover in early June and had a couple stage wins and had been consistent all year long. He won his second race of the year at Chicagoland in September. Sauter won Texas and Phoenix, which advanced him to the final round at Homestead Miami. He finished 3rd in the race but Christopher Bell, who finished runner-up, took the championship and Johnny Sauter finished 2nd in the standings by just one point. Sauter opened up 2018 by winning the Daytona race for the third time in his career. He would subsequently win at Dover, Charlotte, Texas, Bristol, and Martinsville and finish 4th in points.

In May 2018, Sauter returned to the Nationwide (now Xfinity) Series at Dover; he drove the No. 23 GMS car in place of the suspended Spencer Gallagher. He ran the race at New Hampshire Motor Speedway as well in the summer, finishing 19th.

On January 9, 2019, GMS announced the team had parted ways with Sauter. He later rejoined ThorSport to drive the No. 13. Sauter won his first race of the season at Dover in May. At Iowa, Sauter was parked by NASCAR for wrecking Austin Hill under caution on lap 139 of 200. As a result of the incident, he was suspended for the following week's race at Gateway, although he was given a waiver, allowing him to remain playoff eligible if he won a race. Myatt Snider was announced to substitute for Sauter at Gateway. Sauter was eliminated from the playoffs at Las Vegas when he finished 29th after experiencing an engine failure that also plagued three other trucks. Ilmor, the manufacturer of the engines, took responsibility for the NT1 engines that suffered from severe detonation due to the combination of the high engine load condition combined with the extreme weather conditions in Las Vegas. Despite Ilmor's announcement, NASCAR denied ThorSport's request to reinstate Sauter and Grant Enfinger into the playoffs. At Talladega, Sauter appeared to have won the race, but was penalized and placed in 14th for blocking Riley Herbst below the yellow line on the final lap, effectively giving the win to Spencer Boyd. He finished 6th in the final standings.

After he failed to win a race for the first time since 2015 as well as missed the Playoffs for the first time in his career in 2020, ThorSport Racing announced a manufacturer change from Ford to Toyota in 2021. Sauter finished 13th in the 2020 standings, the first time that he finished outside the top ten in the series.

Personal life
Sauter enjoys flying, fishing, and playing the banjo in his free time. He is of the Catholic faith.

Motorsports career results

NASCAR
(key) (Bold – Pole position awarded by qualifying time. Italics – Pole position earned by points standings or practice time. * – Most laps led.)

NASCAR Cup Series

Daytona 500

Xfinity Series

Craftsman Truck Series

 Season still in progress
 Ineligible for series points

References

External links

 
 

Living people
1978 births
People from Necedah, Wisconsin
Racing drivers from Wisconsin
NASCAR drivers
American Speed Association drivers
ARCA Midwest Tour drivers
American Roman Catholics
Richard Childress Racing drivers
Stewart-Haas Racing drivers
NASCAR Truck Series champions
NASCAR Truck Series regular season champions
Multimatic Motorsports drivers
Michelin Pilot Challenge drivers